During the Protectorate period (1653–1659) of the Commonwealth of England, the Lord Protector reserved the power previously held by the monarch to confer knighthoods, baronetcies and peerages.

Knights

Lord Protector Oliver Cromwell
Knights made by Oliver Cromwell.

 Henry Cromwell — his son.
 8 February 1654, Thomas Vyner — Lord Mayor of London (knighted at Grocers' Hall, London).
1653 or 1654, William Boteler.
1 June 1655, John Coppleston — Sheriff of Devon, (knighted at Whitehall). 
11 June 1655, John Reynolds —  commissary general in Ireland, son of Sir James, of Essex, drowned 1657 (knighted at Whitehall). 
 20 September 1655. Christopher Packe — Lord Mayor of London (knighted at Whitehall).
17 January 1656, Colonel Thomas Pride —  (Knighted at Whitehall). 
19 January 1656, John Barkstead — lieutenant of the Tower of London and  major general, of Middlesex (knighted at Whitehall).
3 May 1656 Peter Julius Coyet  — ambassador from the King of Sweden (knighted at Whitehall).
 August 1656,  Richard Combe — of Combe, Co. Herts, (knighted at Whitehall). 
 15 September 1656, John Dethick  — Lord Mayor of London (knighted at Whitehall).
 15 September 1656,  George Fleetwood — of Buckinghamshire, (knighted at Whitehall).
 10 December 1656, William Lockhart — colonel, The Protector's ambassador resident in France (knighted at Whitehall).
 10 December 1656, James Calthorpe — Sheriff of Suffolk  (knighted at Whitehall).
 15 December 1656, Robert Titchborne — Lord Mayor of London (knighted at Whitehall). 
 15 December 1656, Lislebone Long — Recorder of London (knighted at Whitehall).
 6 January 1657, James Whitelocke —  colonel, son and heir of Sir Bulstrode Whitelocke (knighted at Whitehall). 
 3 March 1657, Thomas Dickenson — alderman of York (knighted at Whitehall).
 11 June 1657, Richard Stayner — commander of the frigate Speaker.
 16 July 1657, John Claypole, bart.  —  married Elizabeth, Oliver Cromwell's second daughter (knighted at Whitehall. 
 26 August 1657, William Wheeler — of Channel Row, Westminster (knighted at Hampton Court).  
 2 or 7 November 1657, Edward Ward  — Sheriff of Norfolk. 
 14  November 1657, Thomas Andrews, Alderman and Mayor of London in 1650 (knighted at Whitehall).
 5 December 1657, Thomas Foote, Alderman
 5 December 1657 Thomas Atkins — Alderman and Mayor of London in 1653.
 5 December 1657 1657, John Hewson.
 6 January 1658, James Drax. 
 1 February 1658, Henry Pickering.
 1 February 1658, Philip Twisleton — brother of the Protectorate baronet John Twisleton
 2 or 22 March 1658, John Ireton — (at Whitehall). 
 9 March 1658, John Lenthall.
 22 March 1658,Richard Chiverton (Chevedon) — Lord Mayor of London (knighted at Whitehall). 
 17 July 1658, Henry Jones of Oxfordshire, for distinguished bravery at the Battle of Dunkirk.

Lord Protector  Richard Cromwell
Knights made by Lord Protector Richard Cromwell:
26 November 1658, Thomas Morgan, after the Battle of the Dunes 
6 December 1658, Richard Beke.

Henry Cromwell, Lord Deputy of Ireland
Knights made in Ireland by Henry Cromwell, lord deputy of Ireland. 
 24 November 1657, Matthew Thomlinson — (at Dublin in the Council Chamber).
 2 May 1658, Robert Goodwin — (at Dublin in the Council Chamber). 
 7 June 1658, Maurice Fenton — (in the forenoon at Cork House). 
 7 June 1658, John King — (in the afternoon in the Council Chamber).
 21 July 1658, William Burry — (at Dublin Castle).  
 22 July 1658, John Perceval — (at Dublin Castle).
 26 July 1658, Anthony Morgan — (at Dublin Castle). 
 26 July 1658, Thomas Herbert — (at Dublin Castle). 
 16 November 1658, Hierome Sanky — (at Dublin Castle). 
 16 November 1658, Daniel Abbot — (at Dublin Castle). 
 30 November 1658, Henry Piers — (at Dublin Castle). 
 20 December 1658, William Penn — (at Dublin Castle).  
 24 January 1659, Thomas Stanley — (at Dublin Castle). 
 23 February 1659, Oliver St George — (at Dublin Castle).

Baronets

The following baronetcies were conferred by the lord protector Oliver Cromwell (all the Cromwellian baronetcies became invalid on the restoration of monarchy, 29 May 1660):
 25 June 1657, John Read of Brocket Hall, Hertfordshire. — Read had a baronetcy before the interregnum, so, when Cromwell's baronetcies passed into oblivion, he was entitled to use his previous baronetcy.
 20 July 1657, John Claypole of Northborough, father of Lord Claypole. — Claypole's baronetcy passed into oblivion. 
 6 October 1657, Thomas Chamberlayne — Chamberlayne had a baronetcy before the interregnum, so, when Cromwell's baronetcies passed into oblivion, at the Restoration, he was entitled to use his previous baronetcy.
 5 March 1658, Thomas Beaumont, of Leicestershire — At the Restoration, Beaumont's Cromwellian baronetcy passed into oblivion, but he was granted a new one by Charles II, on 21 February 1661.
 10 April 1658, Colonel Henry Ingoldsby — At the Restoration, Ingoldsby's Cromwellian baronetcy passed into oblivion, but he was granted a new one by Charles II, on 30 August 1661.
 10 April 1658,  John Twisleton. — At the Restoration, Twisleton's Cromwellian baronetcy passed into oblivion.
 10 April 1658, Henry Wright — Son of Cromwell's personal physician, dr. Laurence Wright. At the Restoration, Wright's Cromwellian baronetcy passed into oblivion, but he was granted a new one by Charles II, on 11 June 1660.
 28 May 1658, Griffith Williams, of Carnarvonshire.  — At the Restoration, Williams's Cromwellian baronetcy passed into oblivion, but he was granted a new one by Charles II, on 17 June 1661.
 13 August 1658, Attorney General Edmund Prideaux. — Shortly after Prideaux received the baronetcy, the title was inherited by his son, Edmund Prideaux, and then, less than a year later, passed into oblivion, at the Restoration.
 13 August 1658, Solicitor General William Ellis.  — At the Restoration, Ellis's Cromwellian baronetcy passed into oblivion, but he received a knighthood from king Charles II, on 10 April 1671.
 28 August 1658, William Wyndham, county Somerset. — At the Restoration, Wyndham's Cromwellian baronetcy passed into oblivion, but he received a knighthood from king Charles II (between April 1660 and April 1661) and was granted a baronetcy by Charles II, on 9 December 1661.

The Protectorate baronetcies, being rare, seem to have been much prized; and that of Henry Ingoldsby raised jealousies.

Peers
Peerages conferred by Cromwell were not likely, any more than his Knighthoods and Baronetcies, to be paraded by their possessors after the Restoration.

Permanent life members were created for Cromwell's Other House (similar in concept  to the modern life peers who sit in the House of Lords) and were addressed as "Lord". However with the exception of Lord Eure none of those who already had peerages granted under the ancient regime took up their seats in the Other House. When Oliver Cromwell died, those in the funeral procession who had noble titles under the ancient regime were so called (for example Edward Earl of Manchester), those who had sat in Cromwell's Other House were called lord (for example Philip Lord Skipton), but those such as "George Monck, General in Scotland", who had not taken up their seats in the Other House, were not referred to as lord.

Aside from the Other House members who were known as lords, two peers are known to have been granted by the Lord Protector and a third may have been:
Colonel Charles Howard, a scion of the Norfolk and Surrey and Arundel-landed Howards - "Viscount Howard of Morpeth and Baron Gilsland in Cumberland" — "Cromwell's favourite". He was raised (elevated further) to Earl of Carlisle by Charles II
Edmund Dunch, of Little Wittenham, Berks - Baron Burnell, April 20, 1658  —  Cromwell's relative. Charles II granted him no title and he, his son and grandson (after which it became extinct) did not use the title after the Restoration. 
Bulstrode Whitelocke — possibly a viscount. Cromwell, just before his death wanted to grant him this honour, but no use or record other than this wish is known.

Notes

References
 
 
 
 
 
  – contains a short biography on those knighted by Oliver and Richard Cromwell, and is the source used by both Metcalfe (1885) and Shaw (1906).

Further reading
 

Interregnum (England)
1650s in England
1650s in Ireland
The Protectorate